Guy Tirolien (February 13, 1917 – March 8, 1988) was a Guadeloupean poet. He was born in Point-à-Pitre and died at the age of 71 in Marie-Galante.

Biography 
Guy Tirolien was born in Point-à-Pitre, Guadelope to Furcie Tirolen and Léontine Alméda Colonneau. He was a part of the Négritude ideological movement. He was also a colonial administrator in Cameroon and Mali, where he met several figures of the Harlem Renaissance. However, he was taken prisoner during World War II. Afterwards, he worked as an international civil servant, representing the UN, notably in Mali and Gabon. He is the grandfather of singer-songwriter Malika Tirolien.

Work 
Tirolen is known as the author of "Prière d'un petit enfant nègre" (1943), a poem included in his book "Balles d'or" published by Présence Africaine. The poem is about a black child who does not want to go to the white school. He also wrote "Feuilles vivantes au matin" under the same publisher.

Selected works 
 Balles d'or, published by Présence Africaine in 1961 and 1995
 Feuilles vivantes au matin, published by Présence Africaine in 1977
 De Marie-Galante à une poétique afro-antillaise, published by L'Harmattan, collected by Monde Caraïbe

1917 births
1988 deaths
Guadeloupean poets
20th-century French poets
French male poets
20th-century French male writers